Forbes magazine annually lists the world's wealthiest individuals – "The World's Richest People". What follows is the list of billionaires (in U.S. dollars) in Southeast Asia, issued for 2022.

2022 
Top ten richest identified to a Southeast Asian country, according to Forbes magazine. Family members of royals or politicians are not included.

Number of billionaires by country
As of 2022, limited to countries in Southeast Asia.

See also
 List of wealthiest families
 Lists of people by nationality
 The World's Billionaires

References 

Economy of Southeast Asia-related lists
Lists of people by wealth